Willenhall F.C. was an English association football club based in Willenhall in the Black Country.  The club was formed by the merger of Willenhall Pickwick F.C. and Willenhall Swifts F.C. and competed in the Birmingham & District League, one of the country's strongest semi-professional leagues, between 1919 and 1930.  Willenhall won the league championship in the 1921–22 season.  The club also competed in the FA Cup on at least one occasion.  The town is currently represented by Willenhall Town of the Midland Football Alliance, but this club has no connection to the original Willenhall club.

Former players
1. Players that have played/managed in the Football League or any foreign equivalent to this level (i.e. fully professional league).
2. Players with full international caps.
3. Players that hold a club record.
 Ted Juggins

References

Defunct football clubs in England
Defunct football clubs in the West Midlands (county)
Willenhall
West Midlands (Regional) League
Association football clubs established in 1919